River High School is a public high school in Hannibal, Ohio, United States. It is one of three high schools in the Switzerland of Ohio Local School District. Sports teams are called the Pilots, and they compete as members of the Ohio Valley Athletic Conference.  The school's athletic teams participate in Baseball,
Basketball,
Cross Country,
Football,
Golf,
Softball,
Bowling,
Track and Field,
Volleyball, and
Wrestling.
Student clubs and organizations include:
Art Club,
Fellowship of Christian Students,
French Club,
National Honor Society,
Spanish Club,
Ski Club; among others.

Ohio High School Athletic Association State Championships

 Boys Baseball – 1940*, 1963* 
 * Titles won by Powhatan High School prior to merger into River High School.

References

External links
 District Website

High schools in Monroe County, Ohio
Public high schools in Ohio